Jesse Morrow Mountain is located in Fresno County, California. In December 2012, construction company Cemex agreed not to pursue mining operations which would turn much of the mountain into gravel for building projects.

References

Mountains of Fresno County, California
Mountains of Northern California